This is a list of British television related events from 1979.

Events

January
2 January 
BBC2 airs the first episode of Michael Wood's groundbreaking history documentary series, In Search of the Dark Ages.
Debut of the game show Give Us a Clue on ITV. 
3 January – The children's series The Book Tower makes its debut on ITV which features dramatizations of books as well as interviews with authors. 
3 January – ITV programming resumes in the Yorkshire Television region at 5.45pm, with the station off air for the previous 17 days due to industrial action.
6 January – The US police series CHiPs makes its debut on ITV. 
18 January – The long-running game show Blankety Blank makes its debut on BBC1, presented by Terry Wogan.
28 January – Thomas & Sarah, a spin-off of Upstairs, Downstairs makes its debut on ITV. It runs for only one series.

February
18 February – Debut of the long-running series Antiques Roadshow on BBC1. 
25 February – The children's series Worzel Gummidge makes its debut on ITV, starring Jon Pertwee.

March
3 March – The US action-comedy series The Dukes of Hazzard makes its UK debut on BBC1. 
10 March – The US sitcom Mork and Mindy makes its UK debut on ITV, starring Robin Williams. 
16 March – The long-running US children's series Sesame Street is shown for the first time on STV.
19 March – Richard Beckinsale, best known for The Lovers, Rising Damp, Porridge and its spin-off Going Straight and Bloomers, dies of a congenital heart defect at the age of 31.
24 March – Tales of the Unexpected, an Anglia series based on the short stories of Roald Dahl, makes its debut on ITV.

April
No events.

May
3–4 May – BBC1 and ITV air coverage of the 1979 General Election which is won by the Conservatives and sees Margaret Thatcher become the first female Prime Minister of the UK. The election sees both the Conservatives and Labour include plans for a fourth channel in their election manifestos. Labour favours an Open Broadcasting Authority community service aimed at minority groups while the Conservatives plan is for the channel to be given to ITV, but expresses a preference for a fourth channel to be an independent entity. Both parties also pledge to launch a separate Welsh language television service for Wales.
21 May – John Craven's Newsround goes on its Summer break as it has done since its launch in 1972. When it returns on 10 September, it will run all year round.

June
9 June – Debut of the long-running entertainment series The Paul Daniels Magic Show on BBC1 which goes on to attract an audience of 15 million viewers.
June – BBC2 launches the world's first computer-generated ident, the 'Computer Generated 2'.

July
7 July – The final episode in the original run of Celebrity Squares is broadcast on ITV, although it would be revived at the start of 1993. 
10 July – The supernatural science-fiction series Sapphire & Steel makes its debut on ITV, starring Joanna Lumley and David McCallum. 
28 July – The long-running variety show The Cannon and Ball Show makes its debut on ITV, starring comedians Tommy Cannon and Bobby Ball.

August
6 August 
Technicians at Thames go on strike following a long-running dispute.
Debut of the motorcross game show Kick Start on BBC1. 
10 August – The whole of the ITV network, except Channel Television, is affected by a technicians strike for eleven weeks.
25 August – BBC1 show the 1966 Batman movie.  The is the first UK wide broadcast after previously being shown on only a select few ITV regions.
27 August – Lord Mountbatten was murdered by IRA bombers. His death set a record audience for a news bulletin as 26 million viewers watched the coverage on BBC1. Strike action at ITN led to the record viewing figures.

September
2 September – Subtitling of programmes on Ceefax begins.
3 September – Battle of the Planets, the US adaptation of the popular Japanese science-fiction animated series Gatchaman makes its debut on BBC1. It is shown until 1985.
10 September – The first episode of John le Carré's Tinker Tailor Soldier Spy airs on BBC2 with Alec Guinness as George Smiley.
25 September – Robin Day presents the first edition of the long-running political debate programme Question Time on BBC1 with the panellists Michael Foot, Edna O'Brien, Teddy Taylor and Derek Worlock. It continues to air to the present day.
27 September – Debut of the short-lived sitcom Bloomers on BBC2, starring Richard Beckinsale in his final TV appearance. 
30 September – BBC1 launch the massively popular sitcom To the Manor Born, starring Penelope Keith and Peter Bowles.  The final episode of the series, shown on 11th November, is watched by 23.95 million viewers, the all-time highest figure for a recorded programme in the UK.
September – Home Secretary Willie Whitelaw outlines plans for a fourth channel. However, he backs away from establishing a Welsh language channel for Wales, instead favouring a continuation of the status quo whereby Welsh language content is aired by BBC Wales and HTV.

October
16 October – The comedy sketch show Not the Nine O'Clock News makes it debut on BBC2, starring Rowan Atkinson, Pamela Stevenson, Mel Smith and Griff Rhys Jones. 
24 October
The sitcom Terry and June makes its debut on BBC1, starring Terry Scott and June Whitfield.
On ITV's first night back on the air after the strike, Quatermass, the fourth and final serial featuring Professor Bernard Quatermass begins its run. The title character is played by John Mills.
25 October – "Basil the Rat", the final episode of the John Cleese sitcom Fawlty Towers is broadcast on BBC2.
29 October – The comedy-drama series Minder makes its debut on ITV, starring George Cole and Dennis Waterman.

November
16 November – The Japanese martial arts fantasy series Monkey makes its debut on BBC2 with dubbed English dialogue.

December
18 December – BBC1 airs Gawain and the Green Knight, Stephen Weeks 1973 film starring Murray Head and Nigel Green and based on the medieval poem of the same name.
21 December – BBC1 show a season of The Beatles movies, starting with Magical Mystery Tour, Help! on the 22nd December and Yellow Submarine on the 24th December.
23 December – BBC1 screen the blockbuster 1972 disaster film The Poseidon Adventure, starring Gene Hackman, Ernest Borgnine, Red Buttons, Roddy McDowall and Shelley Winters.
25 December 
Christmas Day highlights on BBC1 includes the network television premiere of the 1973 crime caper movie The Sting, starring Paul Newman and Robert Redford. 
ITV shows the Richard Lester directed 1973 film version of The Three Musketeers, starring Michael York, Oliver Reed, Raquel Welch, Faye Dunaway, Charlton Heston and Christopher Lee.
26 December – The network television premiere of the 1968 WWII action-adventure movie Where Eagles Dare on BBC1, starring Clint Eastwood and Richard Burton.

Unknown
The Independent Broadcasting Authority begins broadcasting its own test card on ITV instead of Test Card F.

Debuts

BBC1
3 January 
The Aphrodite Inheritance (1979)
The Strange Affair of Adelaide Harris (1979)
4 January – Anne of Green Gables (1979)
5 January – Running Blind (1979)
7 January
Telford's Change (1979)
The Fourth Arm (1979)
17 January – Rebecca (1979)
18 January – Blankety Blank (1979–1990, 1997–1999, ITV 2001–2002)
30 January – Blue Remembered Hills (1979)
18 February – Antiques Roadshow (1979–present)
23 February – The Dawson Watch (1979–1980)
1 March – Potter (1979–1983)
3 March – The Dukes of Hazzard (1979–1985)
18 March – My Son, My Son (1979)
21 March – The Perishers (1979)
17 April – The Mourning Brooch (1979)
11 May – Two Up, Two Down (1979)
26 May – Goodbye Darling (1979–1981) 
6 June – The Deep Concern (1979)
9 June – The Paul Daniels Magic Show (1979–1994)
13 June – The Omega Factor (1979)
28 June – Captain Caveman and the Teen Angels (1977–1980)
16 July – Jigsaw (1979–1984)
6 August – Kick Start (1979–1988)
3 September – Battle of the Planets (1978–1980)
4 September 
 A Moment in Time (1979)
 Prince Regent (1979)
7 September – The Red Hand Gang (1977)
11 September – Rolf Harris Cartoon Time (1979–1987)
25 September – Question Time (1979–present)
30 September 
To the Manor Born (1979–1981, 2007)
Shoestring (1979–1980)
3 October – Grandad (1979–1984)
4 October – The All-New Popeye Show (1978–1983)
7 October – The Legend of King Arthur (1979)
12 October –  Penmarric (1979)
24 October – Terry and June (1979–1987)
7 November – The Enchanted Castle (1979)
25 November – Suez 1956 (1979)
4 December – Anne of Green Gables (1979)
9 December – The Old Curiosity Shop (1979–1980)
23 December – Shalcken the Painter (1979)
24 December – What-a-Mess (1979–1980, 1990)

BBC2
16 January – Life on Earth (1979)
17 January – The Innes Book of Records (1979–1981)
15 March – Malice Aforethought (1979)
18 April – Matilda's England (1979)
22 May – Crime and Punishment (1979)
24 June 
 Big Jim and the Figaro Club (1979–1981)
 Turning Year Tales (1979)
2 September – Diary of a Nobody (1979)
6 September – Fred Dibnah: Steeplejack (1979)
10 September – Tinker Tailor Soldier Spy (1979)
26 September – The Camerons (1979)
27 September – Bloomers (1979)
16 October – Not the Nine O'Clock News (1979–1982)
28 October – Friday Night, Saturday Morning (1979–1982)
4 November – Testament of Youth (1979)
15 November – Kelly Monteith (1979–1984)
16 November – Monkey (1978–1980)

ITV
2 January 
 Give Us a Clue (1979–1992, ITV, 1997, BBC)
 Room Service (1979)
3 January – The Book Tower (1979–1989)
6 January 
CHiPs (1977–1983)
Dick Turpin (1979–1982)
Dick Barton - Special Agent (1979)
8 January 
 The Ken Dodd Laughter Show (1979)
 Feet First (1979)
 Danger UXB (1979)
11 January – The Jim Davidson Show (1979–1982)
14 January – Thomas & Sarah (1979)
17 January – Take My Wife (1979)
2 February – Flambards (1979)
21 February – Park Ranger (1979)
23 February – House of Caradus (1979)
25 February – Worzel Gummidge (1979–1981 ITV, 1987–1989, 2019 BBC)
27 February – How's Your Father? (1979–1980)
10 March – Mork & Mindy (1978–1982)
11 March – Agony (1979–1981)
22 March – The Secret Hospital (1979) (documentary)
24 March – Tales of the Unexpected (1979–1985, 1987–1988)
2 April –Chalk and Cheese  (1979)
7 April 
 Kidnapped (1979)
Lovely Couple (1979)
15 April – End of Part One (1979–1980)
23 April 
The Boy Merlin (1979)
 Turtle's Progress (1979–1980)
28 April – After Julius (1979)
21 May – In Loving Memory (1979–1986)
22 May – Thundercloud (1979)
3 June – The Danedyke Mystery (1979)
10 June – The Mallens (1979-1980)
9 July – Spooner's Patch (1979–1982)
10 July – Sapphire & Steel (1979–1982)
11 July – Murder at the Wedding (1979)
12 July – Shelley (1979–1984, 1988–1992)
27 July 
 Charles Endell Esquire (1979–1980)
 Heartland (1979–1980)
28 July – The Cannon and Ball Show (1979–1988)
29 July 
 Screenplay (1979–1981)
 Tropic (1979)
8 August – Border Country (1979)
12 August – Sally Ann (1979)
24 October – Quatermass (1979)
29 October 
Only When I Laugh (1979–1982)
Minder (1979–1994, 2009)
 The Loud House (1979-1988)
10 November – Two People (1979)
11 November 
 The Glums (1979)
Quest of Eagles (1979)
21 November – The Dick Francis Thriller: The Racing Game (1979–1980)
1 December – The Allan Stewart Tapes (1979)
23 December – Cribb (1979–1981)
31 December – The Ravelled Thread (1979)
Unknown 
The Sullivans (1976–1983)
Don't Just Sit There! (1979–1980)

BBC Scotland
7 October – Can Seo (1979)

Television shows

Changes of network affiliation

Returning this year after a break of one year or longer
Fawlty Towers (1975, 1979)
Noggin the Nog (1959–1965, 1979–1982)
Your Life in Their Hands (1958–1964, 1979–1987, 1991)

Continuing television shows

1920s
BBC Wimbledon (1927–1939, 1946–2019, 2021–present)

1930s
The Boat Race (1938–1939, 1946–2019)
BBC Cricket (1939, 1946–1999, 2020–2024)

1940s
Come Dancing (1949–1998)

1950s
The Good Old Days (1953–1983)
Panorama (1953–present)
Crackerjack (1955–1984, 2020–present)
What the Papers Say (1956–2008)
The Sky at Night (1957–present)
Blue Peter (1958–present)
Grandstand (1958–2007)

1960s
Coronation Street (1960–present)
Animal Magic (1962–1983)
Doctor Who (1963–1989, 1996, 2005–present)
World in Action (1963–1998)
Top of the Pops (1964–2006)
Match of the Day (1964–present)
Crossroads (1964–1988, 2001–2003)
Play School (1964–1988)
Mr. and Mrs. (1965–1999) 
World of Sport (1965–1985)
Jackanory (1965–1996, 2006)
Sportsnight (1965–1997) 
Call My Bluff (1965–2005)
It's a Knockout (1966–1982, 1999–2001)
The Money Programme (1966–2010) 
ITV Playhouse (1967–1982)
Magpie (1968–1980)
The Big Match (1968–2002)
Nationwide (1969–1983)
Screen Test (1969–1984)

1970s
The Goodies (1970–1982)
The Onedin Line (1971–1980)
The Old Grey Whistle Test (1971–1987)
The Two Ronnies (1971–1987, 1991, 1996, 2005)
Thunderbirds (1972–1980, 1984–1987)
Clapperboard (1972–1982)
Crown Court (1972–1984)
Pebble Mill at One (1972–1986)
Rainbow (1972–1992, 1994–1997)
Are You Being Served? (1972–1985)
Emmerdale (1972–present)
Newsround (1972–present)
Weekend World (1972–1988)
Pipkins (1973–1981)
We Are the Champions (1973–1987)
Last of the Summer Wine (1973–2010)
That's Life! (1973–1994)
It Ain't Half Hot Mum (1974–1981)
Tiswas (1974–1982)
Wish You Were Here...? (1974–2003)
The Cuckoo Waltz (1975–1980)
Arena (1975–present)
Jim'll Fix It (1975–1994)
The Muppet Show (1976–1981)
When the Boat Comes In (1976–1981)
Multi-Coloured Swap Shop (1976–1982)
Rentaghost (1976–1984)
One Man and His Dog (1976–present)
Robin's Nest (1977–1981)
You're Only Young Twice (1977–1981)
The Professionals (1977–1983)
Blake's 7 (1978–1981)
Ski Sunday (1978–present)
Strangers (1978–1982)
Butterflies (1978–1983, 2000)
3-2-1 (1978–1988)
Grange Hill (1978–2008)

Ending this year
 5 January – The Liver Birds (1969–1979, 1996)
 11 March – Return of the Saint (1978–1979)
 7 July – Celebrity Squares (1975–1979, 1993–1997, 2014–2015)
 25 October – Fawlty Towers (1975–1979)
 16 November – Sykes (1972–1979)
 19 December – General Hospital (1972–1979)
 25 December – George and Mildred (1976–1979)Anne of Green Gables (1979)

Births
 8 January – Tomasz Schafernaker, Polish-born weather presenter
 23 January – Dawn O'Porter, Scottish fashion designer and journalist
 2 February – Christine Bleakley, television presenter
 13 February – Lucy Brown, actress
 10 March – Laura Rogers, actress
 20 March – Freema Agyeman, actress
 12 April – Paul Nicholls, actor
 29 April – Jo O'Meara, singer, dancer and actress
 10 May – Lara Lewington, weather and television presenter
 20 May – Rick Edwards, television presenter 
 27 May – Jeff Brazier, television presenter and reality show contestant
 12 June – Jodie Prenger, actress and singer
 27 July – Julia Haworth, actress
 19 November – Katherine Kelly, actress
 29 November – Simon Amstell, comedian and television presenter
 Unknown
 Leanne Lakey, actress
 Rosamund Pike, actress

Deaths

See also
 1979 in British music
 1979 in British radio
 1979 in the United Kingdom
 List of British films of 1979

References